Love Songs – Koi Uta is the second mini-album from Shion Miyawaki under the label Rhythm Zone. This mini-album contains songs that about the experience of Shion in love that were told in the cellphone story KoiUta.

The DVD includes a PV of the song Lovin' You... and a live performance of the song Shinin' Star. Trackmaker AIRI (also known for doing songs for artists like twenty4-7, Maki Goto and Tohoshinki) wrote the song Memories.

Track listing
CD
 "Loving You…"
 "Shinin’ Star"
 "Last Call"
 "Memories"
 "Everything Is You" -Makai original mix-

DVD
 "Loving you…" Music Video
 "Shinin’ Star" Live Video

References

2009 albums
Shion Miyawaki albums